The Confederação Brasileira de Futebol Americano (CBFA) (translation: American Football Brazilian Confederation), is the main organization for American football in Brazil. Its goal is to help the growth of American football and its development in the country.

History
In the summer of 1986, a small group of boys started playing American football on weekends on Copacabana beach in Rio de Janeiro. Over the next six years, interest and attendance grew until a team was formed; the Rio Guardians was founded on January 4, 1992, becoming the first American football team in Rio de Janeiro. 

In 1994, Mel Owens organized a flag football workshop. This was the first time Rodrigo de Freitas Lagoon appeared in the sport. The Mamutes, with their red shirts, became the first opponent on the beaches of Rio Guardians.

After some departures between 1994 and 1997, the nucleus of what eventually became the Association of Rio de Janeiro began organized play, starting a league and accompanying Carioca Bowl, with six teams.

After seven years, after expanding viewership with international broadcasts and demonstrations for NFL stars such as Tony Gonzalez, the Association of Rio grew to fourteen teams and a championship, playing more than 50 games per year. Its governing body is the Associação Brasileira de Futebol Americano (AFAB).

See also
Brazil national American football team
Superliga Nacional de Futebol Americano
Torneio Touchdown

References

External links
 Facebook Official Page (in Portuguese)

 
Sports governing bodies in Brazil
American football governing bodies